Shankar Guru may refer to:

 Shankar Guru (1978 film), a Kannada-language film directed by V. Somashekhar
 Sankar Guru (1987 film), a Tamil-language film directed by Raja